Lynn Avery Hunt (born November 16, 1945) is the Eugen Weber Professor of Modern European History at the University of California, Los Angeles.  Her area of expertise is the French Revolution, but she is also well known for her work in European cultural history on such topics as gender. Her 2007 work, Inventing Human Rights, has been heralded as the most comprehensive analysis of the history of human rights.  She served as president of the American Historical Association in 2002.

Born in Panama and raised in St. Paul, Minnesota, she has her B.A. from Carleton College (1967) and her M.A. (1968) and Ph.D. (1973) from Stanford University. Before coming to UCLA she taught at the University of California, Berkeley (1974–1987) and the University of Pennsylvania (1987–1998).

Prof. Hunt teaches French and European history and the history of history as an academic discipline. Her specialties include the French Revolution, gender history, cultural history and historiography. Her current research projects include a collaborative study of an early 18th-century work on comparative religion that appeared in 7 volumes with 275 engravings by the artist Bernard Picart.

In 1982 Hunt received a Guggenheim Fellowship to study French History.

Hunt was elected to the American Philosophical Society in 2003. In 2014 she was elected a Corresponding Fellow of the British Academy.

Bibliography

Books 
 
 The Failure of the Liberal Republic in France, 1795–1799: The Road to Brumaire, coauthored with David Lansky and Paul Hanson in The Journal of Modern History Vol. 51, No. 4, December 1979.
 Politics, Culture, and Class in the French Revolution (1984)
 The New Cultural History (1989)
 The Family Romance of the French Revolution (1992)
 Telling the Truth about History (W. W. Norton, 1994)
 Histories: French Constructions of the Past (1995)
 The French Revolution and Human Rights: A Brief Documentary History(1996)
 Beyond the Cultural Turn (1999)
 Liberty, equality, fraternity: exploring the French Revolution [book, CD, and website] (2001)
 The Making of the West: Peoples and Cultures (2005)
 Inventing Human Rights: A History (W. W. Norton, 2007)*Inventing Human Rights: A History (W. W. Norton, 2007)
 La storia culturale nell'età globale, Edizioni ETS, Pisa, 2010
 Writing History in the Global Era (W. W. Norton, 2014)
 History: Why it Matters'' (2018)

Book reviews

References

External links
 Lynn A. Hunt at UCLA Department of History

Living people
1945 births
21st-century American historians
21st-century American women writers
American women historians
Corresponding Fellows of the British Academy
Feminist historians
The New York Review of Books people
Presidents of the American Historical Association
Stanford University alumni
University of California, Berkeley College of Letters and Science faculty
University of California, Los Angeles faculty
University of Pennsylvania faculty
Carleton College alumni
Historians from California
Members of the American Philosophical Society